Hensingham ARLFC is an amateur Rugby league club based in Whitehaven. Founded in 1900, It wasn't until 1920 that the Club changed its allegiances to Rugby League. Hensingham are one of the oldest rugby clubs in the country. They now play their rugby in the NCL Division Three.

National Conference league
Hensingham ARLFC were elected to enter the Kingstone Press National Conference league in 2019 along with two other teams Heworth A.R.L.F.C. and Batley Boys ARLFC.

They got the nod over other strong contenders Nottingham Outlaws and Walney Central ARLFC, Gloucestershire All Golds, Cutsyke Raiders, Distington A.R.L.F.C and East Hull A.R.L.F.C. also being disappointed.

They will be the fourth West Cumbrian club to be accepted into membership of the Conference, joining town rivals Kells A.R.L.F.C., And fellow West Cumbrian rivals Wath Brow and Egremont form the 2019 season. Hensingham will play in division 3.

Youth Team
Within the Youth Section they run team at all age groups from U6s through to U18s 

In the Under-16 cup, it was Hensingham who ran out 26-20 winners to lift the West Cumbria Youth League trophy after a tight game with town rivals Kells.

Hensingham u13's  won League Champions trophy and League Cup and the Grand Final. 2019

In the season 2019 Hensingham played against an Australian touring side Kincumber Colts the Australians won 24.-4

History
The history of Hensingham is long. The clubs presence in rugby circles being unbroken for over a century.

Founded in 1900 and has a long of providing many sportsmen through the delivery of coaching for young people in area. Their present site has been developed since 1973.

They began in a rundown shed known locally as “the Chicken Shed”, and became more succesulf. 

Hensingham were elected to enter the Kingstone Press National Conference league Division 3 in 2019.

Former notable players
 Lee Mossop
 Kyle Amor
 
 Sol Roper
 Jon Roper
 Alan McCurrie
 Vincent Gribbin
 Joseph Bonnar
 Bob Nicholson
 Stephen Holgate
Jason Mossop
Matt Jimmy Dalton

Honours
 BARLA Cumbria Cup: 1990-91, 1993-94, 2002-03, 2017-18
 Cumberland League: 1925-26, 1988-89, 1993-94, 1994-95, 1995-96 2002-2003, 2003-2004
 Cumberland County Cup: 1927-28, 2017-18
 Alliance Championship: 2001-02
 Cumbria Men's League: 2017

References

Rugby league teams in Cumbria
Whitehaven
Rugby clubs established in 1900
1900 establishments in England
Sport in Cumbria
English rugby league teams